Srecka or Sredačka Župa is a remote geographical region, a valley, in southeastern Kosovo, below the Šar Mountains at the source of the Prizren Bistrica.

Geography
 
The region, an oval basin, lies below the Šar Mountains, at the source, upper stream of the Prizren Bistrica. South of the region between the Prizren mountains and Koritnik mountain, lies the Gora region.
It currently includes Sredska, Pousko, Jablanica, Lokvica, Rečane, Živinjane, Planjane, Nebregošte, Manastirica, Stružje, Donje Ljubinje, Gornje Ljubinje, Drajčići, Mušnikovo, Gornje Selo.

History
It was a medieval župa (small administrative division) of the Serbia in the Middle Ages in modern-day southeastern Kosovo. It encompassed seven hamlets and was centered in the town of Sredska. In the early 19th century, Sredačka župa was inhabited by Serbs, and in the first decades Serbian schools were opened here. 

Between 1918 and 1945 Sredačka župa was a municipality of the Kingdom of Yugoslavia. After World War II, in 1945, the Slavophone Muslims in Sredačka župa were ascribed Albanian ethnicity and names by state institutions (as was the case with Gorani and other Muslim non-Albanian speakers). The region was annexed into the municipality of Prizren by the FPR Yugoslavia (1945–63). In 1953, there were 12 villages in the region, and the region was inhabited by "Serbs [...] divided into Muslims and Orthodox" in all villages except Stružje (Struže) inhabited by Albanian Muslims.

Demographics and anthropology

The region is inhabited by a majority of Bosniaks and minority of Serbs (who left during and following the Kosovo War.

Notable people
Vuk Isakovič (1696-1759), Austrian soldier
Čolak-Anta (1777-1853), Serbian revolutionary
Jake Allex (1887-1959), Serbian-American soldier

Annotations
It is known in historiography as Sredačka Župa, Sredska Župa (Средска Жупа) and Sretečka Župa, meaning "County of Sredska")

References

Sources

Further reading

Subdivisions of Serbia in the Middle Ages
Historical regions in Kosovo
Kosovo Serbs